Rothschild Martin Maurel (previously Banque Martin Maurel) is a French private bank headquartered in Paris, with a significant presence in France, Belgium, and Monaco. Its origins date back to 1825.

History

Early History 
The Banque Martin Maurel was established in 1964 as a result of a merger of Banque Martin Frères (founded in 1825) Banque Maurel (founded in 1929) by Robert Maurel. At the time, the bank became a subsidiary of the holding company Compagnie Financière Martin Maurel Société Anonyme.

In 2000, Martin Maurel co-founded the Martin Maurel Sella - Banque Privée Monaco with  the Italian Banca Sella Group which as of 2011 held over 1.8 billion Euros in assets. This is in addition to the existing Monaco operations, which have dated back to 1987.

Acquisition by Rothschild & Co 
In June 2016, Rothschild & Co announced plans to acquire Banque Martin Maurel for €240 million. At the time Martin Maurel had €10 billion of assets under management in France, most of which part of its private banking business. As a result, Rothschild Matin Maurel became leading  independent private bank in France, with combined AUM of €34 billion.

In 2017 after the close of the acquisition, Rothschild merged Banque Martin Maurel and its own private bank Rothschild & Cie Banque to form Rothschild Martin Maurel.

Current Operations 
The bank is headquartered at 29 Avenue de Messine in Paris; however, its main office is at another address in Marseille. The bank has branches in Paris, Marseille, Aix-en-Provence, Lyon, Brussels, Neuilly-sur-Seine, and Monaco.

It is a member of the Groupement Européen de Banques.

References

External links
 Official Website

Companies based in Paris
Banks of France
Banks established in 1964